Eucosmocydia mixographa is a species of moth of the  family Tortricidae. It is found in the Democratic Republic of Congo.

The larvae feed on Piptadenia africana and Mallotus oppositifolius.

References

Moths described in 1939
Grapholitini
Endemic fauna of the Democratic Republic of the Congo